Bernat may refer to:

People

Given name
Bernat Calbó (c. 1180–1243), Catalan jurist, bureaucrat, monk, bishop, and soldier
Bernat Fenollar (1438–1516), Valencia poet, cleric and chess player
Bernat Francés y Caballero, Spanish Roman Catholic bishop
Bernat Guillem d'Entença (died 1237), Spanish noble
Bernat Joan i Marí (born 1960), Spanish politician
Bernat Klein (1922–2014), Serbian textile designer and painter
Bernat Manciet (1923–2005), French writer
Bernat Martínez (1980–2015), Spanish motorcycle racer
Bernat Martorell (died 1452), Catalan painter
Bernat Metge (c. 1340–1413), Catalan writer
Bernat de Palaol (fl. 1386), Catalan troubador and merchant
Bernat Pomar (1932–2011), Mallorcan composer and violinist
Bernat Quintana (born 1986), Spanish actor
Bernat Rosner (born 1932), Hungarian-born American lawyer and concentration camp survivor
Bernat Sanjuan (1915–1979), Spanish painter
Bernat Solé (born 1975), Catalan politician
Bernat Soria (born 1951), Spanish scientist

Surname
Enric Bernat (businessman) (1923–2003), Spanish businessman
Enric Bernat Lunar (born 1997), Spanish footballer
Hans Christian Bernat (born 2000), Danish footballer
Hugo Eyre Bernat (born 1994), Spanish footballer
Ján Bernát (born 2001), Slovak footballer
Jeff Bernat (born 1989), Filipino-American singer
Juan Bernat (born 1993), Spanish footballer
Martín Bernat (fl. 1450–1505), Aragonese painter
Miguel Bernat (born 1957), Argentine chess master
Robert Bernat (1931–1994), American composer
Víctor Bernat (born 1987), Andorran footballer

Places
Bernat, Iran, in Mazandaran Province

See also
Bernard (disambiguation)

Catalan masculine given names